The Ducati Supermono is a lightweight, single-cylinder racing motorcycle made by Ducati and named after the Supermono racing class. 65 Supermonos were built by Ducati between 1993 and 1995.

Technology

This lightweight, compact racer was built with many technical innovations that strongly influenced the design of the 916.

The single cylinder Ducati racer was built with power to weight in mind. Carbon fiber pieces included bodywork, sub frame, fuel tank, rear sets, airbox and instrument housing. Magnesium was used for case covers, chain adjustment covers and triple clamps. 

The front suspension used an Öhlins 42 mm inverted telescopic forks, similar to those used on the Ducati 888 Corsa, and the rear used a cantilevered Ohlins DU2041 shock. It had a Termignoni exhaust and 3 spoke Marchesini magnesium wheels. The front brakes were Brembo 280 mm fully floating iron front discs and Brembo P4 30-34 racing calipers.

The Supermono inherited many of its features from 888 Racing. Liquid cooled double overhead cam shaft with four valve desmodromic cylinder head. A horizontally placed 550 cc cylinder used a dummy connecting rod that acted like a second piston in terms of making the dynamic balance equivalent to a ninety degree Vee twin. This engineering was the key to overcoming vibration problems typically handled with either balance shafts or the incomplete solution of a crank counterweight.

Design

Pierre Terblanche designed the look of the Supermono and Claudio Domenicali and Massimo Bordi designed the frame, power plant and other unique parts of the motorcycle.

Fuel and spark plugs
In the mid-1990s, 100 octane aviation gas was the fuel of choice for many Supermono race teams. Spark plugs with a 54 to 55 heat index were required. Several teams used Champion spark plug QA55V.

Racing
New Zealander Robert Holden placed second in the 1994 Isle of Man TT, winning the 1995 singles title.  Holden won Ireland's NW 200 Supermono class in 1995.

The Supermono was a "test bed" for the World Superbike racers, who would go on to race at the World Superbike Championship.

References

External links

 

Supermono
Racing motorcycles
Motorcycles introduced in 1993
Motorcycles designed by Pierre Terblanche
Single-cylinder motorcycles